Arcade video games takes player input from its controls, processes it through electrical or computerized components, and displays output to an electronic monitor or similar display. All arcade video games are coin-operated or accept other means of payment, housed in an arcade cabinet, and located in amusement arcades alongside other kinds of arcade games. Until the late 1990s, arcade video games were the largest and most technologically advanced segment of the video game industry.

Early prototypical entries Galaxy Game and Computer Space in 1971 established the principle operations for arcade games, and Atari's Pong in 1972 is recognized as the first successful commercial arcade video game. Improvements in computer technology and gameplay design led to a golden age of arcade video games, the exact dates of which are debated but range from the late 1970s to mid-1980s. This golden age includes Space Invaders, Pac-Man, and Donkey Kong. The arcade industry had a resurgence from the early 1990s to mid-2000s, including Street Fighter II, Mortal Kombat, and Dance Dance Revolution, but ultimately declined in the Western world as competing home video game consoles such as the Sony PlayStation and Microsoft Xbox increased in their graphics and gameplay capability and decreased in cost. Nevertheless, Japan, China, and Korea retain a strong arcade industry in the present day.

History

Games of skill were popular amusement-park midway attractions from the 19th century on. With the introduction of electricity and coin-operated machines, they facilitated a viable business. When pinball machines with electric lights and displays were introduced in 1933 (but without the user-controller flippers which would not be invented until 1947) these machines were seen as games of luck. Numerous states and cities treated them as amoral playthings for rebellious young people, and banned them into the 1960s and 1970s.

Electro-mechanical games (EM games) appeared in arcades in the mid-20th century. Following Sega's EM game Periscope (1966), the arcade industry experienced a "technological renaissance" driven by "audio-visual" EM novelty games, establishing the arcades as a suitable environment for the introduction of commercial video games in the early 1970s. In the late 1960s, college student Nolan Bushnell had a part-time job at an arcade where he became familiar with EM games such as Chicago Coin's racing game Speedway (1969), watching customers play and helping to maintain the machinery, while learning the game business.

The early mainframe game Spacewar! (1962) inspired the first commercial arcade video game, Computer Space (1971), created by Nolan Bushnell and Ted Dabney and released by Nutting Associates. It was demonstrated at the Amusement & Music Operators Association (AMOA) show in October 1971. Another Spacewar-inspired coin-operated video game, Galaxy Game, was demonstrated at Stanford University in November 1971. Bushnell and Dabney followed their Computer Space success to create - with the help of Allan Alcorn - a table-tennis game, Pong, released in 1972. Pong became a commercial success, leading numerous other coin-op manufacturers to enter the market.

The video game industry transitioned from discrete integrated circuitry to programmable microprocessors in the mid-1970s, starting with Gun Fight in 1975. The arcade industry entered a "Golden Age" in 1978 with the release of Taito's Space Invaders, which introduced many novel gameplay features - including a scoreboard. From 1978 to 1982, several other major arcade-games from Namco, Atari, Williams Electronics, Stern Electronics, and Nintendo were all considered blockbusters, particularly  Namco's Pac-Man (1980), which became a fixture in popular culture. Across North America and Japan, dedicated video-game arcades appeared and arcade-game cabinets appeared in many smaller storefronts. By 1981, the arcade video-game industry was worth  in the US.

The novelty of arcade games waned sharply after 1982 due to several factors, including market saturation of arcades and arcade games, a moral panic over video games (similar to fears raised over pinball machines in the decades prior), and the 1983 video game crash as the home-console market impacted arcades. The arcade market had recovered by 1986, with the help of software-conversion kits, the arrival of popular beat 'em up games (such as Kung-Fu Master (1984) and Renegade (1986-1987)), and advanced motion simulator games (such as Sega's "taikan" games including Hang-On (1985), Space Harrier (1985), and Out Run (1986)). However, the growth of home video-game systems such as the Nintendo Entertainment System led to another brief arcade decline toward the end of the 1980s.

Arcade games continued to improve with the development of technology and of gameplay. In the early 1990s, the release of Capcom's Street Fighter II established the modern style of fighting games and led to a number of similar games such as Mortal Kombat, Fatal Fury, Killer Instinct, Virtua Fighter, and Tekken, creating a new renaissance in the arcades. Another factor was realism, including the "3D Revolution" from 2D and pseudo-3D graphics to "true" real-time 3D polygon graphics. This was largely driven by a technological arms-race between Sega and Namco. During the early 1990s games such as Sega's Virtua Racing and Virtua Fighter popularized 3D-polygon technology in arcades. 3D graphics later became popular in console and computer games by the mid-1990s, though arcade systems such as the Sega Model 3 remained considerably more advanced than home systems in the late 1990s. Until about 1996, arcade video-games had remained the largest segment of the global video-game industry. Arcades declined in the late 1990s, surpassed by the console market for the first time around 1997–1998.

Since the 2000s, arcade games have taken different routes globally. In the United States, arcades have become niche markets as they compete with the home-console market, and they have adapted other business models, such as providing other entertainment options or adding prize redemptions. In Japan and China, where arcades continue to flourish, games like Dance Dance Revolution and The House of the Dead aim to deliver tailored experiences that players cannot easily have at home.

Technology

Virtually all modern arcade games (other than the very traditional fair midway) make extensive use of solid state electronics, integrated circuits, and monitor screens, all installed inside an arcade cabinet.

With the exception of Galaxy Game and Computer Space, which were built around small form-factor mainframe computers, the first arcade games are based on combinations of multiple discrete logic chips, such as transistor–transistor logic (TTL) chips. Designing an arcade game was more about the combination of these TTL chips and other electronic components to achieve the desired effect on screen. More complex gameplay required significantly more TTL components to achieve this result. By the mid-1970s, the first inexpensive programmable microprocessors had arrived on the market. The first microprocessor-based video game is Midway's Gun Fight in 1975 (a conversion of Taito's Western Gun), and with the advent of Space Invaders and the golden era, microprocessor-based games became typical. Early arcade games were also designed around raster graphics displayed on a cathode-ray tube (CRT) display. Many games of the late 1970s and early 1980s use special displays that rendered vector graphics, though these waned by the mid-1980s as display technology on CRTs improved. Prior to the availability of color CRT or vector displays, some arcade cabinets have a combination of angled monitor positioning, one-way mirrors, and clear overlays to simulate colors and other graphics onto the gameplay field.

Coin-operated arcade video games from the 1990s to the 2000s generally use custom hardware often with multiple CPUs, highly specialized sound and graphics chips, and the latest in expensive computer graphics display technology. This allows more complex graphics and sound than contemporary video game consoles or personal computers. Many arcade games since the 2000s run on modified video game console hardware (such as the Sega NAOMI or Triforce) or gaming PC components (such as the Taito Type X). Many arcade games have more immersive and realistic game controls than PC or console games. This includes specialized ambiance or control accessories such as fully enclosed dynamic cabinets with force feedback controls, dedicated lightguns, rear-projection displays, reproductions of automobile or airplane cockpits, motorcycle or horse-shaped controllers, or highly dedicated controllers such as dancing mats and fishing rods. These accessories are usually too bulky, expensive, and specialized to be used with typical home PCs and consoles. Arcade makers experiment with virtual reality technology. Arcades have progressed from using coins as credits to smart cards that hold the virtual currency of credits.

Modern arcade cabinets use flat panel displays instead of cathode-ray tubes. Internet services such as ALL.Net, NESiCAxLive, e-Amusement and NESYS, allow the cabinets to download updates or new games, do online multiplayer gameplay, save progress, unlock content, or earn credits.

Genres

Many arcade games have short levels, simple and intuitive control schemes, and rapidly increasing difficulty. The classic formula for a successful arcade video game is "easy to learn, difficult to master" along with a "multiple life, progressively difficult level" paradigm. This is due to the environment of the arcade, where the player is essentially renting the game for as long as their in-game avatar can stay alive or until they run out of tokens. Games on consoles or PCs can be referred to as "arcade games" if they share these qualities, or are direct ports of arcade games.

Arcade racing games often have sophisticated motion simulator arcade cabinets, a simplified physics engine, and short learning time when compared with more realistic racing simulations. Cars can turn sharply without braking or understeer, and the AI rivals are sometimes programmed so they are always near the player with a rubberband effect. Other types of arcade-style games include music games (particularly rhythm games), and mobile and casual games with intuitive controls and short sessions.

Action
The term "arcade game" can refer to an action video game designed to play similarly to an arcade game with frantic, addictive gameplay. The focus of arcade action games is on the user's reflexes, and many feature very little puzzle-solving, complex thinking, or strategy skills. These include fighting games often played with an arcade controller, beat 'em up games including fast-paced hack and slash games, and light gun rail shooters and "bullet hell" shooters with intuitive controls and rapidly increasing difficulty.

Many arcade combat flight simulators have sophisticated hydraulic motion simulator cabinets, and simplified physics and handling. Arcade flight games are meant to have an easy learning curve, in order to preserve their action component. Increasing numbers of console flight video games, such as Crimson Skies, Ace Combat, and Secret Weapons Over Normandy indicate the falling of manual-heavy flight sim popularity in favor of instant arcade flight action.

A modern subgenre of action games called "hack and slash" or "character action games" represent an evolution of traditional arcade action games, and are sometimes considered a subgenre of beat 'em up brawlers. This subgenre of games was largely defined by Hideki Kamiya, creator of the Devil May Cry and Bayonetta franchises.

Industry
Arcade games are found in restaurants, bowling alleys, college campuses, video rental shops, dormitories, laundromats, movie theaters, supermarkets, shopping malls, airports, and other retail environments. They are popular in public places where people are likely to have free time.

Their profitability is expanded by the popularity of conversions of arcade games for home-based platforms. In 1997, WMS Industries (parent company of Midway Games) reported that if more than 5,000 arcade units are sold, at least 100,000 home version units will be sold.

The American Amusement Machine Association (AAMA) is a trade association established in 1981 that represents the American coin-operated amusement machine industry, including 120 arcade game distributors and manufacturers. The Japan Amusement Machine and Marketing Association (JAMMA) represents the Japanese arcade industry. Arcade machines may have standardized connectors or interfaces such as JAMMA, or JVS, that help with quick replacement of game systems or boards in arcade cabinets. The game boards or arcade boards may themselves allow for games to be replaced via game cartridges or discs.

Conversions, emulators, and recreations
Prior to the 2000s, successful video games were often converted to a home video game console or home computer. Many of the initial Atari VCS games, for example, were conversions of Atari's success arcade games. Arcade game manufacturers that were not in the home console or computer business found licensing of their games to console manufacturers to be a successful business model, as console manufacturer competitors would vie for rights to more popular games. Coleco famously bested Atari to secure the rights to convert Nintendo's Donkey Kong, which it subsequently included as a pack-in game for the ColecoVision to challenge the VCS.

Arcade conversions typically had to make concessions for the lower computational power and capabilities of the home console, such as limited graphics or alterations in gameplay. Such conversions had mixed results. The Atari VCS conversion of Space Invaders was considered the VCS's killer application, helping to quadruple the VCS sales in 1980. In contrast, the VCS conversion of Pac-Man in 1982 was highly criticized for technical flaws due to VCS limitations such as flickering ghosts and simplified gameplay. Though Pac-Man was the best-selling game on the VCS, it eroded consumer confidence in Atari's games and partially contributed to the 1983 crash.

The need for arcade conversions began to wane as arcade game manufacturers like Nintendo, Sega, and SNK entered the home console market and used similar technology within their home consoles as found at the arcade, negating the need to simplify the game. Concessions still may be made for a home release; notably, the Super Nintendo Entertainment System conversion of Mortal Kombat removed much of the gore from the arcade version to meet Nintendo's quality control standards.

Exact copies of arcade video games can be run through emulators such as MAME on modern devices. An emulator is an application that translates foreign software onto a modern system, in real-time. Emulated games appeared legally and commercially on the Macintosh in 1994 with Williams floppy disks, Sony PlayStation in 1996, and Sega Saturn in 1997 with CD-ROM compilations such as Williams Arcade's Greatest Hits and Arcade's Greatest Hits: The Atari Collection 1, and on the PlayStation 2 and GameCube with DVD-ROM compilations such as Midway Arcade Treasures. Arcade games are downloaded and emulated through the Nintendo Wii Virtual Console service starting in 2009.

Using emulation, companies like Arcade1Up have produced at-scale or reduced-scale recreations of arcade cabinets using modern technology, such as LCD monitors and lightweight construction. These cabinets are typically designed to resemble the original arcade game cabinets, but may also support multiple related games. These cabinets can be offered in diverse and miniaturized styles, such as table-mounted and wall-mounted versions.

Highest-grossing

For arcade games, success is usually judged by either the number of arcade hardware units sold to operators, or the amount of revenue generated. The revenue can include the coin drop earnings from coins (such as quarters, dollars, or 100 yen coins) inserted into machines, and/or the earnings from hardware sales with each unit costing thousands of dollars. Most of the revenue figures listed below are incomplete as they only include hardware sales revenue, due to a lack of available data for coin drop earnings which typically account for the majority of a hit arcade game's gross revenue. Most of the games listed were released between the golden age of arcade video games (1978–1984) and the 1990s.

Franchises

These are the combined hardware sales of at least two or more arcade games that are part of the same franchise. This list only includes franchises that have sold at least 5,000 hardware units or grossed at least $10 million revenues.

See also

 Claw crane
 JAMMA
 List of arcade video games
 Medal game
 Money booth
 Neo Geo
 Winners Don't Use Drugs

Notes

References

External links

 The Video Arcade Preservation Society
 Online collection of Automatic Age trade journals, 1925–1945
 System 16 – The Arcade Museum
 Arcade History (Coin-Op Database)
 The Museum of Soviet Arcade Games (blog article)

 
Video game platforms
Video game terminology
Children's entertainment